Varel is a town in the district of Friesland, in Lower Saxony, Germany. With a population of 23,984 (2020) it is the biggest town in the district of Friesland.

Geography 

Varel is located south of the Jade Bight at the North Sea on the Geest. Over time, the city expanded into lower areas as the construction of dykes helped to secure these areas from floods.

The environment of Varel is shaped by agriculture, forests and the sea.

Neighbour municipalities 

Jade in the district of Wesermarsch is the Eastern neighbour municipality of Varel. In the South of Varel one will find the municipalities Rastede and Wiefelstede which are part of the district of Ammerland. The municipality of Bockhorn is located in the West of Varel. Bockhorn is also part of the district of Friesland.

Segmentation of the city 

Varel is segmented into 21 localities. Besides the downtown area these are Altjührden, Borgstede, Büppel, Dangast, Dangastermoor, Grünenkamp, Hohelucht, Hohenberge, Jeringhave, Jethausen, Langendamm, Moorhausen, Neudorf, Neuenwege, Obenstrohe, Rallenbüschen, Rosenberg, Seghorn, Streek and Winkelsheide. Further villages in the municipality are Almsee, Bramloge, Brunne, Jethausermoor, Logemoor, Plaggenkrug, Rahling, Rotenhahn, Schwarzenberg, Tange, Vareler Schleuse and Wilkenhausen.

Usage of areas 

A little more than three fourths of the area of Varel is agricultural land. The size of the forest – around ten percent of the total size – is remarkably high for a city at the North Sea coast.

Castle church 

The castle church is the oldest building in Varel. The first part of the church is believed to have been built in 1144. The tower was added between 1200 and 1250, originally as twin towers, which were rebuilt in today's form first in 1651 and then in 1737. The altar, font and pulpit were carved in 1613 – 1618 by Ludwig Münstermann.

Before the Protestant Reformation, the patron saint was Saint Peter. Today, the castle church is a Lutheran church, with no patron saint.
The church was formerly one of the buildings of the castle, which was demolished in the 19th century soon after a fire destroyed most parts of it.

Notable people 

Charlotte Sophie Bentinck (1715–1800), confidante of Voltaire and Frederick the Great
 Johann Gerhard Oncken (1800–1884), founder of the German and continental European Baptist churches
 Lothar Meyer (1830–1895), developed about the same time and independent of Dmitri Mendeleev modern periodic table of the elements
 Oskar Emil Meyer (1834–1909), physicist
 Frederick Ludwig Hoffman (1865–1946), statistician
 Wilhelm Hegeler (1870–1943), writer
 Carl Carls (1880–1958), chess champion
Erich Heckel (1883–1979), painter
Karl Schmidt-Rottluff (1884–1976), expressionist painter and printmaker
Friedrich Wegener (1907–1990), pathologist
 Hildegard Behrens (1937–2009), singer (dramatic soprano)
Hans-Paul Bürkner (born 1951), CEO of the Boston Consulting Group
Heiko Daxl (1957–2012), media artist, exhibition curator, art gallery owner and design / art collector
 Ines Varenkamp (born 1963), cyclist
Markus Eichler (born 1982), cyclist
Massiv in Mensch (founded in 1996), industrial musical duo
 Esther Henseleit (born 1999), professional golfer

International relations

Varel is twinned with:
  Jackson, Michigan (United States)

References

External links 

 Official site 

Port cities and towns of the North Sea
Friesland (district)
Grand Duchy of Oldenburg